This is a list of percussion instruments.

Tuned percussion 
 Cimbalom
 Crotales
 Dhol
 Dholki
 Gong
 Glass harmonica
 Hammered dulcimer
 Handbells
 Hang
 Lithophone
 Marimba
 Metallophone
 Mridangam
 Glockenspiel
 The harp stop and other effects on the organ
 Quadrangularis Reversum
 Skrabalai
 Steel drums
 Tabla
 Timpani (kettle drum)
 Tubular bell
 Vibraphone
 Xylophone
 Xylorimba

Auxiliary percussion (Untuned percussion) 

 Agogo bells
 Anvil
 Dayereh (doyra)
 Frame drum
 Finger cymbals
 Flexatone
 Glass harp
 Jam blocks
 Jordan Slap
 Knee Slap
 Marching machine
 Monkey stick (mendoza or lagerphone)
 Ratchet
 Rattle
 Sand blocks
 Siren
 Slapstick (whip or woodcrack)
 Jingle bells (sleigh bells)
 Slide whistle
 Tambourine
 Tambour
 Taxi horn
 Temple blocks
 Thunder machine
 Thundersheet
 Triangle
 Vibraslap
 Whistle
 Wind chime
 Wind machine
 Wood block
 Snare Drum
 Bass Drum
 Cymbals
 Suspended Cymbal

Persian percussion 
 Tombak
 Daf
 Dayereh
 Esarkoten
 Dohol

Latin/Afro-Caribbean percussion 

 Afoxé
 Alfaia
 Atabaque
 Agogô
 Batá drum
 Bond
 Bongo drums
 Cabasa
 Castanets
 Cajón (box drums)
 Caxixi
 Chácaras
 Claves
 Conga
 Cowbell
 Cuíca
 Djembe
 Dunun
 Ganzá
 Gonguê
 Güiro (a.k.a. scraper)
 Hand-repique
 Jawbone (instrument)
 Maracas
 Pandeiro
 Repique
 Ring-repique
 Shekere
 Surdo
 Tambora
 Tamborim
 Tan-tan
 Timbal
 Timbales
 Zabumba
 Zill

Indian percussion 

 Thavil
 Pakhawaj
 Mridangam
 Kachhi Dhol
 Manjeeras
 Kanjeera
 Ghungroos

Further reading 
 Shen, Sinyan, Acoustics of Ancient Chinese Bells, Scientific American, 256, 94 (1987).

See also 
 List of percussion instruments
 Brass instruments
 Drum kit
 Gamelan
 Latin percussion
 List of membranophones
 Percussion instruments
 String instruments
 Tuned percussion
 Untuned percussion
 Woodwind instruments

External links 
 Percussion instruments

 Type

et:Löökpillide loend
pt:Anexo:Lista de instrumentos de percussão